Munditia proavita is an extinct species of sea snail, a marine gastropod mollusk, in the family Liotiidae.

Distribution
This species occurs in New Zealand.

References

Liotiidae